This is an (incomplete) list of former equipment used by the Finnish Army. For current equipment, see here.

Tanks and other armoured vehicles

Cold War era tanks

World War 2 tanks

Pre-war tanks

IFVs and APCs

Armoured cars

Various vehicles
{| class="wikitable sortable"

! style="text-align: left; width:20%;"|Model

! style="text-align: left; width:10%;"|Origin

! style="text-align: left; width:18%;"|Type

! style="text-align: left; width:7%;"|Quantity

! style="text-align: left; width:10%;"|Image

! style="text-align: left; width:35%;"|Details

|-

| Sisu Nasu

|

| Tracked articulated vehicle

|
|

|In use between 1980s–2017. 27 NA-122 self-propelled mortars and 12 NA-123 ammunition supply vehicles are still in use.

|-

| Bandvagn 202

|

| Tracked articulated vehicle

|15 units

|

|
|-

| MAZ-537G

|

| Tank transporter

| 6 units<ref>Panssarihistoriaseminaari 2009</ref>

|

| Pulling the ChMZAP-5247G semi-trailer.

|-

| GT-SM

|

| Tracked transport vehicle

|
||
|
|-

| ATS-59

|

| Artillery tractor

|28 units

|

| In use between 1965 and 2002.

|-

| AT-S

|

| Artillery tractor

|50 units

|

| In use between 1960 and 2002.

|-

| Raupenschlepper Ost

|

| Artillery tractor

|20 units

|

| In use between 1943–.

|-

| Sisu KB-45

|

| Off-road lorry

|83 units

|

| In use between 1965 and 2008.

|-

| Sisu A-45

|

| Off-road lorry

|about 500 units

|

| In use between 1970 and 2008.

|-

| Vanaja VAKS

|

| Military truck

|155 units

|

| In use between 1960–.

|-

| Vanaja NS-47

|

| Military truck

|38 units

|

| In use between 1962–.

|-

| Sd.Kfz. 9

|

| Half-track

|2 units

|

| In use between 1943–. recovery vehicle, arrived with the purchase of the StuG III assault guns.

|-

| Büssing-Nag 4500 A

|

| Lorry

|
|

| In use between 1943 and 1945.

|-

| M2 half-track car

|

| Half-track

|213 units

|

| In use between 1948 and 1964.

|-

| McCormick TD-14

|

| Artillery tractor

|
|

| In use between 1940 until the 1950s.

|-

| Ford Thames

|

| Military truck

|115 units
|
| 

|-

|-

| ZIL-157

|

| Military truck

|86 units

|

| In use between 1962 until the 1990s.

|-

| KrAZ-255B

|

| Military truck

|
|

| In use between 1962 until the 2010s.

|-

| ZIL-131

|

| Military truck

|about 400 units

|

| In use between 1973 until the 2010s.
|-

| UAZ-452

|

| Off-road van

|
|

| In use between 1973 until the 2010s.

|-

| UAZ-469UAZ-315126

|

| Off-road military light utility vehicle

|250+ units

|

| In use between 1976 until the 2000s.
|-
| GAZ-51

|

| Military truck

|100 units

|

| In use between 1962 until 1970s.

|-

| GAZ-66

|

| Off-road lorry

|440 units

|

| In use between 1972 until the 2000s.
|-

| GAZ-69

|

| Off-road military light utility vehicle

|
|

| 
|-

| Unimog D

|

| Military truck

|99 units
|

| In use between 1955 until ?.

|-

| Unimog G

|

| Military truck

|69 units
|

| In use between 1955 until ?.

|-
|Valmet 702

|

|Tractor

|
|

|
|}

Railroad artillery

Rocket launchers

Self-propelled artillery

Howitzers
Heavy Howitzers (150-210 mm)

Medium howitzers (105-122mm)

Field guns
Heavy field guns (130-155mm)

Medium field guns (105-122mm)

Light field guns (63-84mm)

Siege artillery

Mortars
Heavy mortars (160-300 mm)

Heavy mortars (120 mm)

Medium mortars (81-107 mm)

Light mortars (47-60 mm)

Siege mortars

Infantry weapons
Light machine guns

Machine guns

Squad support weapon

Assault rifles

Submachine guns

Service rifles

Handguns

Anti-aircraft weapons
Surface-to-air missiles

Self-propelled anti-aircraft guns

Heavy anti-aircraft artillery

Medium anti-aircraft artillery

Anti-aircraft cannons and machine guns

Radars

Anti-tank weapons
Guided anti-tank weapons

Unguided anti-tank rockets

Anti-tank guns and rifles

Anti-ship missiles

References

Sources
 
 
 
 Palokangas, Markku (1991): Sotilaskäsiaseet Suomessa 1918-1988''. Vammalan Kirjapaino Oy. 
 
 
 
 

Military equipment of Finland
Finland